"Mitwa" is a popular Hindi song from the 2006 Hindi film Kabhi Alvida Naa Kehna directed by Karan Johar, starring Shah Rukh Khan, Rani Mukerji, Abhishek Bachchan, Preity Zinta, Amitabh Bachchan and Kirron Kher. The song is composed by Shankar–Ehsaan–Loy, while the lyrics are penned by Javed Akhtar. It was sung by noted Pakistani vocalist, Shafqat Amanat Ali along with Caralisa Monteiro who also penned the phrase "love will find a way..." in the song.

Development
Shankar Mahadevan had previously heard the song "Aankhon Ke Saagar" by Pakistani vocalist Shafqat Amanat Ali on the radio, and impressed by his vocals, gathered details about him from a friend at the radio station. When Shankar–Ehsaan–Loy composed Mitwa, they decided to opt for Ali instead of Mahadevan himself, since they wanted the song to sound different. The song is a Sufi rock ballad, which is the first of its kind in a Karan Johar film. The trio used the traditional Indian instruments Santoor and Sarod which was played by Mahadevan.

Reception and performance
The song received excellent feedback from critics and audience alike. The song ruled the charts in coming days. Bollywood Hungama, in its half-yearly music roundup, remarked, "The song that rocks most is 'Mitwa', that has so far been responsible for the good opening of KANK."

Trivia
Actress Vidya Balan is admittedly a fan of the song. "When Mitwa plays, my hands go out like Shah Rukh Khan's". She insisted that the song Bakhuda Tumhi Ho be played when the romantic sequences between Vidya Balan and Shahid Kapoor were shot for the movie Kismat Konnection (July 18th, 2008).

See also
Kabhi Alvida Naa Kehna (soundtrack)

References

Indian songs
Hindi film songs
Songs with music by Shankar–Ehsaan–Loy
2006 songs
Songs with lyrics by Javed Akhtar